Jens Rathke (14 November 1769 – 28 February 1855) was a Norwegian  professor, scientist and zoologist.

Biography
Rathke was born in Christiania (now Oslo), Norway. He was the son of Casper Elias Rathke (1729-1777) and Margaretha Madsdatter Schultz (1735-1812).
He was a student at the Christiania Cathedral School until 1787. Rathke took Cand.theol. at the University of Copenhagen in 1792, but soon left theology and began to study natural sciences.

In 1810, he became  a professor at Copenhagen, where he also undertook lessons in botany and mineralogy beside zoology. In 1813, he moved to the University of Christiania (now University of Oslo)  as a professor of natural history. He made several trips to along the Norwegian coast from Bergen to Lofoten  to investigate the conditions of fisheries. He presented the results of these studies in   Beiträge zur Fauna Norwegens  which was published in 1843.  At his death he bequeathed his estate and funded a trust (Rathkes legat) at the University of Oslo to use for study of Norway's natural conditions.

References

1769 births
1855 deaths
Scientists from Oslo
University of Copenhagen alumni
Academic staff of the University of Copenhagen
Academic staff of the University of Oslo
18th-century Norwegian scientists
19th-century Norwegian zoologists
18th-century Norwegian educators
19th-century Norwegian educators